Leonardo de Magalhães Visgueiro Pereira (born August 11, 1987 in Maceió), known as Léo Maceió, is a Brazilian footballer who plays for Flamengo–PI as right back.

Career statistics

References

External links

1987 births
Living people
Brazilian footballers
Association football defenders
Campeonato Brasileiro Série C players
Campeonato Brasileiro Série D players
Associação Atlética Coruripe players
People from Maceió
Sportspeople from Alagoas